This is a list of films which placed number one at the weekely box office in Mexico for the year 2001.

References

See also
 List of Mexican films — Mexican films by year
 Lists of box office number-one films

2001
Box
Mexico